The following is a list of notable events and releases of the year 2016 in Icelandic music.

Events

January
 15
 Icelandic broadcaster RÚV revealed the songs competing to be Iceland's entry in the Eurovision Song Contest 2016 during the Rás 2 radio programmes Virkir morgnar and Poppland. Five of the competitors enter English versions of their songs.

February
 20
 At Söngvakeppnin 2016 in Reykjavík's Laugardalshöll, Greta Salóme was selected to represent Iceland at the Eurovision Song Contest, with the song "Hear Them Calling".

July 
 6 – The 17th Folk music festival of Siglufjordur start in Siglufjordur (July 6 – 10).

Album and Singles releases

February

July

See also 
 2016 in Iceland
 Music of Iceland
 Iceland in the Eurovision Song Contest 2016

References

Icelandic music
Icelandic
Music